Reversion-inducing-cysteine-rich protein with kazal motifs, also known as RECK, is a human gene, thought to be a metastasis suppressor.

The protein encoded by this gene is a cysteine-rich, extracellular protein with protease inhibitor-like domains whose expression is suppressed strongly in many tumors and cells transformed by various kinds of oncogenes. In normal cells, this membrane-anchored glycoprotein may serve as a negative regulator for matrix metalloproteinase-9, a key enzyme involved in tumor invasion and metastasis. It is one of the targets of an oncomiR, MIRN21.

References

Further reading